The 1999 Potters Holidays World World Indoor Bowls Championship  was held at Potters Leisure Resort, Hopton on Sea, Great Yarmouth, England, from 16–25 January 1999.

In the singles the unseeded Alex Marshall won his first title beating David Gourlay in the final.
In the pairs John Price & Stephen Rees beat defending champions Richard Corsie & Graham Robertson in the final.

The women's singles competition took place in Prestwick from April 14–16. The event was won by Caroline McAllister.

Winners

Draw and results

Men's singles

Men's Pairs

Women's singles

References

External links 
 

World Indoor Bowls Championship